General elections were held in Dominica in March 1928.

Electoral system
The Legislative Council had 13 members, with the Administrator as President, six 'official' members (civil servants), four elected members and two appointed members. Candidacy for the elected seats was limited to people with an annual income of at least £200 or owning property valued at £500 or more.

Results

The appointed members were Henry Harry Vivian Whitchurch and Gerald Augustus Carlton Grell.

References

Dominica
1928 in Dominica
Elections in Dominica
Dominica
Election and referendum articles with incomplete results
March 1928 events